Nazir Kashmiri was a prolific character actor in Hindi cinema who appeared in over 100 films. His career extended from 1941 to 2008 spanning 67 years.

He started his career in Lahore. He appeared in several Lahore productions before moving to Bombay with Noor Jehan's production company. He appeared in Noor's Indian films Zeenat (1945) and Jugnu (1947).

Through the 1950s and 1960s he was frequently seen in a wide variety of roles. Kashmiri was particularly a fixture of B. R. Chopra films appearing in most of Chopra's films from Ek Hi Raasta (1956) to Kaala Patthar (1979). Kashmiri was also seen in many Dev Anand, Guru Dutt and I. S. Johar films.

References

External links
 

Indian male film actors
Male actors in Hindi cinema
Possibly living people
Year of birth missing
20th-century Indian male actors